The Chandelier Stakes is an American Thoroughbred horse race held annually at the end of September at Santa Anita Park in Arcadia, California. It is restricted to two-year-old fillies.  The Grade II race is contested at a distance of one and one-sixteenth miles on the main track at Santa Anita Park in Arcadia, California.

The race is currently part of the Breeders' Cup Challenge series.  The winner will automatically qualify for the Breeders' Cup Juvenile Fillies.

As of 2012, this race was renamed the Chandelier Stakes having formerly being referred to as the Oak Leaf Stakes.

From 1997 through 2001, the race was run at a distance of one mile (8 furlongs).

As of 2020 the race was downgraded to Group II.

Records
Speed record:
 1:41.20 – It's In The Air (1978)

Most wins by a jockey:
 5 – Chris McCarron (1983, 1986, 1987, 1988, 1992)

Most wins by a trainer:
 11 – Bob Baffert (1997, 1998, 1999, 2000, 2002, 2005, 2007, 2012, 2013, 2016, 2019)

Most wins by an owner:
 2 – Barry Beal & Lloyd French Jr. (1982, 1986)
 2 – Bob & Beverly Lewis (1994, 2002)
 2 – Golden Eagle Farm (1998, 2000)

Winners

Chandelier Stakes

Oak Leaf Stakes

‡ In 2010 run at Hollywood Park.

See also
Road to the Kentucky Oaks

Notes

References
The 2008 Oak Leaf Stakes at the NTRA

Horse races in California
Santa Anita Park
Flat horse races for two-year-old fillies
Breeders' Cup Challenge series
Grade 1 stakes races in the United States
Graded stakes races in the United States
Recurring sporting events established in 1969
1969 establishments in California